The Mazda CX-90 is a large crossover SUV with three-row seating produced by the Japanese automaker Mazda. It is the second vehicle to use Mazda's rear- and all-wheel drive Skyactiv Multi-Solution Scalable Architecture with longitudinal engine layout after the CX-60. The largest Mazda SUV to date, the CX-90 will replace the CX-9 in North America.

Overview 
The CX-90 was revealed in January 31, 2023 for the North American market, while a release in the Australian and Middle Eastern markets were also confirmed for 2023. With the use of the rear-wheel-drive-biased large vehicle platform, it is placed into the brand's internal "Large Product Group" category. According to Jeff Guyton, President and CEO of Mazda North American Operations, the CX-90 addresses many of the weaknesses of the CX-9 such as its small interior space.

Available with mild hybrid and plug-in hybrid powertrain options, the CX-90 became Mazda’s first production model to offer a hybrid powertrain in the North American market. There are two market dependent, mild hybrid engine options.

All-wheel-drive and a eight-speed automatic transmission are standard for all models.

The CX-90 is also equipped with the Kinematic Posture Control technology, a feature originally developed for the 2022 MX-5 Miata and also present in the similar CX-60. The software suppresses the vehicle's body lift during cornering to improve stability and traction, helping occupants maintain a natural posture.

According to sources, the CX-9 will be discontinued in North America, replaced by the CX-90 or CX-70.

Marketing 
Mazda USA released a series of teaser videos featuring Japanese actor Hiroyuki Sanada from January 12 to the CX-90's unveiling on January 31.

References

External links 

  (U.S.)

CX-90
Cars introduced in 2023
Crossover sport utility vehicles
All-wheel-drive vehicles
Hybrid sport utility vehicles
Plug-in hybrid vehicles
Partial zero-emissions vehicles
Cars powered by longitudinal 4-cylinder engines